Akwuba Charles Ugochukwu  (born November 4, 1989), professionally known as DJ Coublon, is a Nigerian record producer and sound engineer. He is best known for producing hit songs with several prominent artists in the Nigerian music industry, including Kiss Daniel, Iyanya, Yemi Alade, Tekno Miles, Patoranking, Seyi Shay, among others.

Early life and career
Born on November 4, 1989, he began his interest in music at the age of 7. He is a graduate of Physics with Electronics from Veritas University in Abuja, Nigeria. DJ Coublon began his music career in Onitsha, Anambra State, Southeastern Nigeria.  In 2013 he moved to Lagos where he met other artists like Iyanya and Kiss Daniel. He was signed onto Made Men Music Group between September 2014 to 2016.

Production credits

Awards and nominations

References

Living people
Nigerian record producers
1989 births
People from Anambra State